The North Slob is an area of mud-flats at the estuary of the River Slaney at Wexford Harbour, Ireland. The North Slob is an area of  that was reclaimed in the mid-19th century by the building of a sea wall. It is the lowest geographical point on the island of Ireland.

 of this reclaimed land is a nature reserve that is jointly owned and managed by BirdWatch Ireland and the National Parks and Wildlife Service (NPWS) as the Wexford Wildfowl Reserve (Irish: Anaclann Éanlaith Fiáin Loch Garman).  The reserve is open to the public.

Wildlife
The North Slob provides the winter home for 10,000 white-fronted geese, about one third of the world population, which migrate to Greenland for the summer months .

International recognition
The Wexford Wildfowl Reserve was designated a Ramsar site in 1984.

Guinness World Records
Guinness World Records, known until 2000 as The Guinness Book of Records has its origins in the North Slob. On 4 May 1951, Sir Hugh Beaver, then the managing director of the Guinness Breweries, was on a shooting party in the North Slob when he became involved in an argument over which was the fastest game bird in Europe, the golden plover or the grouse. That evening at Castlebridge House he realised that it was impossible to confirm in reference books whether or not the golden plover was Europe's fastest game bird.
He knew that there must be numerous other questions debated nightly in pubs in Britain and Ireland, but there was no book with which to settle arguments about records. He realised then that a book supplying the answers to this sort of question might prove popular.

The North Slob featured on the Open University and BBC's Coast Programme.

References

External links
 Wexford Wildfowl Reserve Website

Wexford, County Wexford
Birdwatching sites in Ireland
Land reclamation
Bird conservation
Nature reserves in the Republic of Ireland
Wildlife sanctuaries of Ireland
Ramsar sites in the Republic of Ireland